Herbert O. Tudor was an American college football player and coach and athletics administrator. He served as the head football coach and athletic director at Parsons College in Fairfield, Iowa in 1915 and later as the head football coach at the University of Louisiana at Lafayette–then known as Southwest Louisiana Institute–in 1920.

Tudor was a graduate of the University of Kansas, where he lettered in football in 1912 and 1913.

Head coaching record

References

Year of birth missing
Year of death missing
American football guards
Kansas Jayhawks football players
Louisiana Ragin' Cajuns football coaches
Parsons Wildcats athletic directors
Parsons Wildcats football coaches